HNLMS Bloys van Treslong (F824) was a frigate of the . The ship was in service with the Royal Netherlands Navy from 1982 to 2003. The frigate was named after Dutch naval hero Willem Bloys van Treslong. The ship's radio call sign was "PADG".

Dutch service history
HNLMS Bloys van Treslong was built at Wilton-Fijenoord in Schiedam. The keel laying took place on 5 May 1978 and the launching on 15 November 1980. The ship was put into service on 25 November 1982.

In 1993, the ship served as station ship in the West Indies. In this period, she was sent to Haiti in support of the United Nations peace mission Support Democracy.

In 2003, the vessel was decommissioned and sold to the Hellenic Navy.

Greek service history
The ship was transferred in 2003 to the Hellenic Navy where she was renamed Nikiforos Fokas using the radio call sign "SZCH".

Notes

Kortenaer-class frigates
1980 ships
Ships built by Wilton-Fijenoord